The Armenian Evangelical Peter and Elizabeth Torosian School is a school in Bourj Hammoud, Lebanon. The school was established as a kindergarten in 1951, by Rev Hadidian, and began with 20 children in a 2-roomed flat. By the next year, the number of students had almost doubled, and an elementary section was added. In 1966, the school moved to a new building in Amanos-Dora, which had been provided by Mr and Mrs Torossian – hence the school's name.

The present principal is Seta Karageozian.

History
The Armenian Evangelical Peter & Elizabeth Torosian School was founded in 1951 in Amanos area, which is located east of Beirut City. It started with kindergarten classes that developed into an Intermediate School by 1973. Rev. Yenovk Hadidian was the key person in the founding of this school and Mr. Augustin Badeer was another committed Evangelical who supported the growing steps of the school until it got the present three-floor building in 1981. 
Torosian is a neighborhood school. Most of the students live a walking distance from school. Past principals include Alice Filhanessian, Hagop Boujikanian (1969-1973)

The school implements the Lebanese Government Curriculum in Kindergarten, Elementary and Intermediate levels.

The school's mission is to educate the Armenian new generation with Christian, Armenian, sound and decent education.

See also
Armenian Evangelical School of Trad (Trad, Lebanon)
Armenian Evangelical Guertmenian School (Ashrafieh, Lebanon)
Armenian Evangelical Shamlian Tatigian Secondary School (Bourj Hammoud, Lebanon)
Armenian Evangelical Central High School (Ashrafieh, Lebanon)
Yeprem and Martha Philibosian Armenian Evangelical College (Beirut, Lebanon)
Armenian Evangelical Secondary School of Anjar (Anjar, Lebanon)
Haigazian University (Riad El Solh, Beirut, Lebanon)

References

External links
Educational Council of the Union of the Armenian Evangelical Churches in the Near East (UAECNE)

Schools in Lebanon
Armenian Evangelical schools
1951 establishments in Lebanon
Educational institutions established in 1951